The 2013 WNBA season is the 6th season for the Atlanta Dream of the Women's National Basketball Association. The Dream finished second in the Eastern Conference with a 17-17 record, and won the Eastern Conference Finals, sweeping the Indiana Fever to earn their third trip in four years to the WNBA Finals, where they were swept by the Minnesota Lynx in three games.

Transactions

WNBA Draft

Trades and Roster Changes

Roster
{| class="toccolours" style="font-size: 95%; width: 100%;"
|-
! colspan="2" style="background:#6495ED;color:white;"|2013 Atlanta Dream Roster
|- style="text-align:center; background-color:#FF0000; color:#FFFFFF;"
! Players !! Coaches
|-
| valign="top" |
{| class="sortable" style="background:transparent; margin:0px; width:100%;"
! Pos. !! # !! Nat. !! Name !! Ht. !! Wt. !! From
|-

Schedule

Preseason

|- style="background:#cfc;"
| 1
| May 9
| @ Tulsa
| 
| Courtney Clements (18)
| Aneika Henry (10)
| Armintie Herrington (3)
| BOK Center5280
| 1–0
|-

Regular Season

|- style="background:#cfc;"
| 4
| May 25
|  Tulsa
| 
| Tiffany Hayes (21)
| Sancho Lyttle (10)
| Jasmine Thomas (6)
| Philips Arena7519
| 1–0
|- style="background:#cfc;"
| 5
| May 31
| @ Indiana
| 
| Angel McCoughtry (29)
| Sancho Lyttle (11)
| Alex Bentley (6)
| Bankers Life Fieldhouse10756
| 2–0
|-

|- style="background:#cfc;"
| 6
| June 2
| @ Washington
| 
| Angel McCoughtry (15)
| Sancho Lyttle (9)
| Angel McCoughtry (5)
| Verizon Center8938
| 3–0
|- style="background:#cfc;"
| 7
| June 7
|  New York
| 
| Sancho Lyttle (18)
| Tiffany Hayes (7)
| Angel McCoughtry (10)
| Philips Arena6173
| 4–0
|- style="background:#fcc;"
| 8
| June 9
| @ New York
| 
| Sancho Lyttle (18)
| Sancho Lyttle (11)
| Angel McCoughtry (5)
| Prudential Center5933
| 4–1
|- style="background:#cfc;"
| 9
| June 14
|  Seattle
| 
| Angel McCoughtry (23)
| Angel McCoughtry (9)
| Angel McCoughtry (7)
| Philips Arena4960
| 5–1
|- style="background:#cfc;"
| 10
| June 16
|  Chicago
| 
| Angel McCoughtry (23)
| Erika de Souza (11)
| Tiffany Hayes (8)
| Philips Arena5552
| 6–1
|- style="background:#cfc;"
| 11
| June 23
| @ Connecticut
| 
| Angel McCoughtry (34)
| Le'Coe Willingham (7)
| Angel McCoughtry (2)
| Mohegan Sun Arena7557
| 7–1
|- style="background:#cfc;"
| 12
| June 25
|  Indiana
| 
| Erika de Souza (17)
| Erika de Souza (10)
| McCoughtry & Herrington (4)
| Philips Arena10155
| 8–1
|- style="background:#cfc;"
| 13
| June 28
|  Washington
| 
| Angel McCoughtry (21)
| Erika de Souza (9)
| Tiffany Hayes (6)
| Philips Arena5512
| 9–1
|- style="background:#cfc;"
| 14
| June 30
|  San Antonio
| 
| Tiffany Hayes (19)
| Erika de Souza (7)
| Angel McCoughtry (9)
| Philips Arena5359
| 10–1
|-

|- style="background:#fcc;"
| 15
| July 9
| @ Minnesota
| 
| Angel McCoughtry (16)
| Erika de Souza (13)
| Angel McCoughtry (5)
| Target Center8623
| 10–2
|- style="background:#fcc;"
| 16
| July 14
| @ Seattle
| 
| de SouzaBentley (16)
| Erika de Souza (14)
| Alex Bentley (5)
| Key Arena6479
| 10–3
|- style="background:#fcc;"
| 17
| July 17
| @ Los Angeles
| 
| Angel McCoughtry (24)
| Erika de Souza (18)
| Angel McCoughtry (5)
| Staples Center10876
| 10–4
|- style="background:#fcc;"
| 18
| July 21
| @ Tulsa
| 
| Angel McCoughtry (21)
| Erika de Souza (16)
| Alex Bentley (3)
| BOK Center4107
| 10–5
|- style="background:#cfc;"
| 19
| July 24
|  Connecticut
| 
| Angel McCoughtry (22)
| Erika de Souza (10)
| Angel McCoughtry (6)
| Philips Arena4434
| 11–5
|-

|- align="center"
|colspan="9" bgcolor="#bbcaff"|All-Star Break
|- style="background:#fcc;"
| 20
| August 3
| @ Phoenix
| 
| Angel McCoughtry (33)
| Erika de Souza (11)
| Angel McCoughtry (8)
| US Airways Center8138
| 11–6
|- style="background:#fcc;"
| 21
| August 10
| @ Indiana
| 
| Angel McCoughtry (17)
| Erika de Souza (5)
| Alex Bentley (5)
| Bankers Life Fieldhouse9271
| 11–7
|- style="background:#fcc;"
| 22
| August 11
|  New York
| 
| Angel McCoughtry (30)
| Erika de Souza (10)
| McCoughtry & Thomas (5)
| Philips Arena4576
| 11–8
|- style="background:#fcc;"
| 23
| August 14
| @ Connecticut
| 
| Angel McCoughtry (33)
| McCoughtry & de Souza (8)
| Armintie Herrington (6)
| Mohegan Sun Arena5206
| 11–9
|- style="background:#cfc;"
| 24
| August 16
|  Connecticut
| 
| Angel McCoughtry (30)
| Erika de Souza (15)
| Angel McCoughtry (8)
| Philips Arena4435
| 12–9
|- style="background:#cfc;"
| 25
| August 18
|  Washington
| 
| Tiffany Hayes (23)
| Erika de Souza (8)
| Jasmine Thomas (4)
| Philips Arena4873
| 13–9
|- style="background:#cfc;"
| 26
| August 20
|  Minnesota
| 
| Tiffany Hayes (23)
| Erika de Souza (16)
| Alex Bentley (6)
| Philips Arena4855
| 14–9
|- style="background:#fcc;"
| 27
| August 23
| @ Washington
| 
| Angel McCoughtry (17)
| Erika de Souza (12)
| Angel McCoughtry (8)
| Verizon Center7088
| 14–10
|- style="background:#fcc;"
| 28
| August 24
|  Chicago
| 
| Angel McCoughtry (20)
| Erika de Souza (16)
| Angel McCoughtry (3)
| Philips Arena7412
| 14–11
|- style="background:#fcc;"
| 29
| August 28
|  Washington
| 
| Angel McCoughtry (23)
| Erika de Souza (14)
| Alex Bentley (7)
| Philips Arena4415
| 14–12
|- style="background:#fcc;"
| 30
| August 31
| @ Chicago
| 
| Alex Bentley (19)
| Erika de Souza (9)
| Jasmine Thomas (6)
| Allstate Arena6047
| 14–13
|-

|- style="background:#cfc;"
| 31
| September 2
|  Los Angeles
| 
| Erika de Souza (27)
| Jasmine Thomas (8)
| Alex Bentley (11)
| Philips Arena5504
| 15–13
|- style="background:#cfc;"
| 32
| September 4
|  Indiana
| 
| Angel McCoughtry (30)
| Erika de Souza (15)
| Angel McCoughtry (8)
| Philips Arena4019
| 16–13
|- style="background:#cfc;"
| 33
| September 6
| @ New York
| 
| Angel McCoughtry (16)
| Erika de Souza (14)
| Angel McCoughtry (3)
| Prudential Center7021
| 17–13
|- style="background:#fcc;"
| 34
| September 8
|  Phoenix
| 
| Angel McCoughtry (25)
| Erika de Souza (10)
| Armintie Herrington (5)
| Philips Arena9740
| 17–14
|- style="background:#fcc;"
| 35
| September 11
| @ Connecticut
| 
| Angel McCoughtry (23)
| Angel McCoughtry (10)
| Angel McCoughtry (7)
| Mohegan Sun Arena5724
| 17–15
|- style="background:#fcc;"
| 36
| September 13
| @ Chicago
| 
| Angel McCoughtry (29)
| Erika de Souza (13)
| Jasmine Thomas (6)
| Allstate Arena7679
| 17–16
|- style="background:#fcc;"
| 37
| September 15
| @ San Antonio
| 
| Alex Bentley (17)
| Aneika Henry (10)
| Jasmine Thomas (6)
| AT&T Center7486
| 17–17
|-

Standings

Playoffs

|- style="background:#fcc;"
| 1
| September 19
|  Washington
| 
| Angel McCoughtry (20)
| Erika de Souza (12)
| Angel McCoughtry (3)
| Philips Arena3862
| 0–1
|- style="background:#cfc;"
| 2
| September 21
| @ Washington
| 
| Angel McCoughtry (20)
| Erika de Souza (15)
| Jasmine Thomas (6)
| Verizon Center7065
| 1–1
|- style="background:#cfc;"
| 3
| September 23
|  Washington
| 
| de Souza & Hayes (18)
| Erika de Souza (14)
| Angel McCoughtry (7)
| Philips Arena4078
| 2–1
|-

|- style="background:#cfc;"
| 1
| September 26
|  Indiana
| 
| Tiffany Hayes (23)
| Armintie Herrington (7)
| Herrington & McCoughtry (5)
| Philips Arena4238
| 1–0
|- style="background:#cfc;"
| 2
| September 29
| @ Indiana
| 
| Angel McCoughtry (27)
| Armintie Herrington (9)
| Angel McCoughtry (3)
| Bankers Life Fieldhouse7051
| 2–0
|-

|- style="background:#fcc;"
| 1
| October 6
| @ Minnesota
| 
| Angel McCoughtry (17)
| Aneika Henry (14)
| Armintie Herrington (3)
| Target Center13804
| 0–1
|- style="background:#fcc;"
| 2
| October 8
| @ Minnesota
| 
| Angel McCoughtry (15)
| Erika de Souza (8)
| Angel McCoughtry (4)
| Target Center12313
| 0–2
|- style="background:#fcc;"
| 3
| October 10
|  Minnesota
| 
| Tiffany Hayes (20)
| Erika de Souza (9)
| Alex Bentley (6)
| Gwinnett Center5040
| 0–3
|-

Playoffs

Statistics

Regular Season

Playoffs

Awards and Honors

References

External links

Atlanta Dream seasons
Atlanta
Eastern Conference (WNBA) championship seasons
Atlanta Dream